Valuy is a rural locality (a selo) in Krasnogvardeysky District, Belgorod Oblast, Russia. The population was 314 as of 2010. There are 3 streets.

Geography 
Valuy is located 21 km south of Biryuch (the district's administrative centre) by road. Biryuch is the nearest rural locality.

References 

Rural localities in Krasnogvardeysky District, Belgorod Oblast